The 2014–15 Pacific Tigers women's basketball team will represent the University of the Pacific during the 2014–15 NCAA Division I women's basketball season. The Tigers come off of a season of new beginnings after they rejoined the West Coast Conference. Despite the new conference, the Tigers placed third in the WCC and made the WNIT for the third consecutive season. The Tigers were led by ninth year head coach Lynne Roberts and play their home games in the Alex G. Spanos Center. They finished the season 21–10, 13–5 in WCC play to finish in a tie for third place. They lost in the quarterfinals of the 2015 West Coast Conference women's basketball tournament to San Francisco. They were invited to the Women's National Invitation Tournament where they lost to Sacramento State in the first round.

Roster

Schedule

|-
!colspan=9 style="background:#FF7F00; color:#000000;"|Exhibition

|-
!colspan=9 style="background:#000000; color:#FF7F00;"| Regular Season

|-
!colspan=9 style="background:#FF7F00;"| 2015 WCC Tournament

|-
!colspan=9 style="background:#FF7F00;"| WNIT

Rankings

References

Pacific Tigers women's basketball seasons
Pacific
Pacific Tigers
Pacific Tigers